The Hungary men's national under-18 basketball team is a national basketball team of Hungary, administered by the Hungarian Basketball Federation. It represents the country in men's international under-18 basketball competitions.

FIBA U18 European Championship participations

See also
Hungary men's national basketball team
Hungary men's national under-16 basketball team
Hungary women's national under-19 basketball team

References

External links
Archived records of Hungary team participations

Basketball in Hungary
Hungary national basketball team
Basketball
Men's national under-18 basketball teams